Rufflets Hotel is a 4 star hotel near St. Andrews, Fife, Scotland.

History

Rufflets House 1924–1952

Rufflets House itself was built in 1924 as a private home for Mrs Anne Brydon Gilroy, the widow of a prominent Dundee jute baron, and was designed by Dundee architect Donald Mills. Local records going back as far as 1642 indicate that the land was owned by the Priory of St Andrews as part of the Priory Acres and it was known as the "Ruch (pronounced "ruff") Flets", which in the Scots tongue, means "rough, flat lands".

Rufflets Hotel 1952 to date

The house was bought by George and Margaret Cook and Anna & James Meldrum in 1952 and turned into one of the UK's first country house hotels.  The hotel is still in the same family and has been rated by The Automobile Association as one of the top 200 hotels in Britain since 1999.

The hotel has modern conference hosting facilities.

Awards

Rufflets holds many awards including:

 Four AA Red Stars and Two AA Red Rosettes
 Four Gold Stars from Visit Scotland

In the press

In August 2006 the hotel's restaurant received press coverage with the launch of cosmeceutical enhanced menu which the restaurant claims contains "ingredients known for their anti-ageing properties to help diners to have longer, more youthful lives".

In February 2008 the hotel became Scotland's first carbon neutral hotel as part of a sustainable tourism drive.

References

External links

 Official website

Hotels in Fife
Houses completed in 1924
Hotels established in 1952
1952 establishments in Scotland
St Andrews